Benjamin Welch Owens served in a Confederate Maryland artillery unit during the Civil War. A statue honoring him in Lothian, Maryland, United States, was vandalized in June 2020 and toppled in July 2020.

See also
 List of monuments and memorials removed during the George Floyd protests

References

Monuments and memorials in the United States removed during the George Floyd protests
Buildings and structures in Anne Arundel County, Maryland
Monuments and memorials in Maryland
Outdoor sculptures in Maryland
Sculptures of men in Maryland
Statues in Maryland
Vandalized works of art in Maryland
Statues removed in 2020